Jeffrey Kluger (born 1954) is a senior writer at Time magazine and author of nine books on various topics, such as The Narcissist Next Door (2014); Splendid Solution: Jonas Salk and the Conquest of Polio (2005);  The Sibling Effect (2011); and Lost Moon: The Perilous Voyage of Apollo 13 (1994).  The latter work was the basis for Ron Howard's film Apollo 13 (1995). He is also the author of two books for young adults: Nacky Patcher and the Curse of the Dry-Land Boats (2007) and Freedom Stone (2011).

Early life and education 
Jeffrey Kluger was born in 1954 to a Jewish Family. Kluger attended Pikesville High School in Pikesville, Maryland, a northwest suburb of Baltimore.  He attended the University of Maryland and earned a Bachelor of Arts degree in political science in 1976, and the University of Baltimore Law School, where he earned a Juris Doctor degree in 1979. He is a licensed attorney, and was admitted to the state bar in the Commonwealth of Pennsylvania.

Career 
From June 1992 to September 1996, Kluger was a staff writer for Discover magazine, writing the humor column "Light Elements". He also worked as a writer and editor for The New York Times, Business World Magazine, Family Circle magazine, and Science Digest.

Kluger began his work with Time magazine in 1996 specializing in science coverage. He was named a senior writer in 1998. During his tenure at Time, Kluger has written articles covering the Mars Pathfinder landing and the 2003 Columbia disaster. He is the author or co-author of more than 40 cover stories, including Time's coverage of the Oklahoma tornadoes of 2013, the Fukushima disaster in 2011, the battle to eradicate polio (2011) and the developing science of caring for premature babies (2014).

Kluger has authored numerous books, most notably Lost Moon: The Perilous Voyage of Apollo 13 (October 1994), with coauthor Jim Lovell. Lost Moon would become the basis for the Ron Howard film Apollo 13 (1995) starring Tom Hanks. Kluger would later be a technical consultant for, and appear in, the movie Apollo 13: The IMAX Experience.

Kluger has taught journalism at New York University.

Awards and honors
In 2001, the Overseas Press Club of America awarded Kluger and Michael Lemonick the Whitman Bassow Award for "best reporting in any medium on international environmental issues" for their work on global warming.

Bibliography 

 
 
 
 
 
  
  (A children's book)

References

External links 
 Official Website
 Kluger's biography at TIME Magazine's website
 Review of Simplexity at Letters On Pages
 

1954 births
Living people
American science writers
Jewish American writers
People from Pikesville, Maryland
Time (magazine) people
Discover (magazine) people
University of Baltimore School of Law alumni
21st-century American Jews